Leionema is a genus of more than 20 species of mostly small shrubs in the family Rutaceae, most of which are endemic to eastern Australia.
Plants within this genus have scented foliage and clustered, star-shaped flowers which range in colour from cream to bright yellow. Prior to 1998, all species within this genus were included in the genus Phebalium.

Species list 
The following is a list of species and subspecies accepted by the Australian Plant Census as at April 2020, and including the New Zealand endemic Leionema nudum:
Leionema ambiens  (F.Muell.) Paul G.Wilson  — forest phebalium
Leionema bilobum (Lindl.) Paul G.Wilson — notched phebalium
 Leionema bilobum (Lindl.) Paul G.Wilson subsp. bilobum
 Leionema bilobum subsp. serrulatum (F.Muell.) Duretto & K.L.Durham
 Leionema bilobum subsp. thackerayense Duretto & K.L.Durham
 Leionema bilobum subsp. truncatum (Hook.f.) Duretto & K.L.Durham
Leionema carruthersii (F.Muell.) Paul G.Wilson 
Leionema ceratogynum N.G.Walsh  
Leionema coxii (F.Muell.) Paul G.Wilson  
Leionema dentatum (Sm.) Paul G.Wilson — toothed phebalium
Leionema diosmeum (A.Juss.) Paul G. Wilson  
Leionema elatius (F.Muell.) Paul G.Wilson — tall phebalium
 Leionema elatius subsp. beckleri (F.Muell.) Paul G.Wilson
 Leionema elatius (F.Muell.) Paul G.Wilson subsp. elatius 
Leionema ellipticum Paul G.Wilson  
Leionema equestre (D.A.Cooke) Paul G.Wilson  
Leionema gracile (C.T. White) Paul G.Wilson  
Leionema hillebrandii (J.H. Willis) Paul G.Wilson  
Leionema lachnaeoides (A.Cunn.) Paul G.Wilson  
Leionema lamprophyllum (F.Muell.) Paul G.Wilson   — shiny phebalium
 Leionema lamprophyllum subsp. fractum S.A.J.Bell
 Leionema lamprophyllum (F.Muell.) Paul G.Wilson  subsp. lamprophyllum
 Leionema lamprophyllum subsp. obovatum F.M.Anderson
 Leionema lamprophyllum subsp. orbiculare F.M.Anderson
Leionema microphyllum (F.Muell.) Paul G.Wilson  
Leionema montanum (Hook.) Paul G.Wilson  
Leionema nudum (Hook.) Paul G.Wilson  — Mairehau,  endemic to the North Island of New Zealand
Leionema obtusifolium (Paul G.Wilson) Paul G.Wilson           	 
Leionema oldfieldii (F.Muell.) Paul G.Wilson  
Leionema phylicifolium (F.Muell.) Paul G.Wilson  — mountain phebalium
Leionema praetermissum P.R.Alvarez & Duretto
Leionema ralstonii  (F.Muell.) Paul G.Wilson   
Leionema rotundifolium (A.Cunn. ex Endl.) Paul G.Wilson — round-leaved phebalium
Leionema scopulinum B.M.Horton & Crayn
Leionema sympetalum (Paul G.Wilson) Paul G.Wilson  — Rylstone Bell
Leionema viridiflorum (Paul G.Wilson) Paul G.Wilson  — green phebalium
Leionema westonii  L.M.Copel. & I.Telford

References

 
Australian Plant Name Index (APNI): Leionema (species)
Association of Societies for Growing Australian Plants (ASGAP): Leionema carruthersii
PlantNET — New South Wales Flora Online Leionema (list of species)

 
Taxa named by Paul G. Wilson
Zanthoxyloideae genera